is a Japanese footballer currently playing as a midfielder for Oita Trinita.

Career statistics

Club
.

Notes

References

External links

2002 births
Living people
People from Ōita (city)
Sportspeople from Ōita Prefecture
Association football people from Ōita Prefecture
Japanese footballers
Association football midfielders
Oita Trinita players